Simon of Athens was an Athenian writer on horses and horsemanship of the fifth century BC. His writings are quoted by Xenophon.

Life 

It is not known when Simon lived. However, it cannot have been much before 460 BC, as he is known to have criticised a work of the Athenian painter Micon, who lived at about that time.

According to Xenophon, Simon dedicated a bronze statue of a horse, on a plinth decorated with reliefs of his deeds, in the Eleusinion in the Agora of Athens.

Works 

Simon's writings are quoted by Xenophon, who refers to him both in the Hipparchikós and in Perì hippikēs ("on horsemanship"). A fragment attributed to him is contained in the Byzantine Hippiatrica, an assemblage of Greek texts on horse care and horse medicine dating from the fifth or sixth century AD; it deals with the characteristics of a good horse, and is entitled , or roughly "on the ideal horse". Another fragment is included in the Onomasticon of Julius Pollux.

His works were believed otherwise lost until, in 1853, the French philologist Charles Victor Daremberg discovered a single chapter in the library of Emmanuel College, Cambridge. All the extant fragments of Simon's writings were published by Franz Rühl in 1912.

Simon is mentioned three times in the Hippiatrica: there are two passing mentions of him as an authority like Xenophon, and an account of his criticism of Micon's painting.

References

Further reading 

 Antonio Sestili (2006). L'equitazione nella Grecia antica: i trattati equestri di Senofonte e i frammenti di Simone (in Italian). Scandicci (Firenze): Firenze Atheneum. .

Writers on horsemanship
5th-century BC Athenians
Ancient Greek writers